During the 1993–94 season, Karlsruher SC played in the Bundesliga, the highest tier of the German football league system.

Season summary
Karlsruher SC repeated last season's sixth-place finish, and reached the semi-finals of the UEFA Cup before elimination by Casino Salzburg on away goals.

Players

First team squad
Squad at end of season

Transfers

In
  Edgar Schmitt -  Eintracht Frankfurt
  Slaven Bilić -  Hajduk Split
  Heiko Bonan -   VfL Bochum
  Pero Škorić -   SC 08 Bamberg

References

Notes

External links

Karlsruher SC seasons
Karlsruher SC